Dan Nielson (born March 13, 1983) is an American basketball coach who is currently the head women's basketball coach at Utah Valley University, a role he has held since 2019. He was previously the associate head coach at Brigham Young University (BYU), and has spent the entirety of his coaching career with either BYU or Utah Valley.

Head coaching record

Notes

References

External links 
 
 Utah Valley Wolverines profile

1983 births
Living people
People from Round Rock, Texas
Basketball coaches from Texas
Brigham Young University alumni
BYU Cougars women's basketball coaches
Utah Valley Wolverines women's basketball coaches